Wolfgang Hübner (born 2 February 1952) is a German weightlifter. He competed in the men's middleweight event at the 1976 Summer Olympics.

References

1952 births
Living people
German male weightlifters
Olympic weightlifters of East Germany
Weightlifters at the 1976 Summer Olympics
Sportspeople from Chemnitz